Bosel or Bosal may  refer to:

Bösel, a municipality in the district of Cloppenburg, in Lower Saxony, Germany
Bosel, medieval Bishop of Worcester.
Otto Bösel (1913-1975), Hauptwachmeister in the Luftwaffe during World War II. 
Greta Bösel (1908-1947), German concentration camp guard, executed for war crimes
Nasir Iqbal Bosal, Pakistani politician
Bosal, Korean pronunciation for a bodhisattva.
Bosal, a type of hackamore noseband, sometimes misspelled "bosel."
 Bozal Spanish, the Spanish spoken by negros bozales, slaves recently taken from Africa.